Njan Piranna Nattil is a 1985 Indian Malayalam-language film directed and produced by P. Chandrakumar and written by P. M. Thaj. The film stars Mohanlal, Aruna, Raghavan and Bhagyalakshmi. The film has musical score by A. T. Ummer.

Plot

Cast
Mohanlal
Aruna
Bhagyalakshmi
M. G. Soman
Saleema as Shailaja

Soundtrack
The music was composed by A. T. Ummer with lyrics by Poovachal Khader.

Release

References

External links
 

1985 films
1980s Malayalam-language films
Films directed by P. Chandrakumar